KLHW may refer to:

 MidCoast Regional Airport at Wright Army Airfield (ICAO code)
 KLHW-LP, a low-power radio station (90.5 FM) licensed to serve Kansas City, Missouri, United States